Big B, Inc. was a Birmingham, Alabama-based drugstore chain. The company began operation in 1968 as division of Birmingham based Bruno's Supermarkets.  Most of its stores were located next to a Bruno's, Food World or FoodMax.  Big B also operated a discount drugstore chain called Drugs For Less. The company had close to $800 million in revenue by the end of 1996.

In 1982, Big B was spun off from the Bruno's Supermarkets into an independent company, Big B, Inc., based in Bessemer, Alabama.  In 1989, Big B acquired 85 Reed Drug and Lee Drug stores from Peoples Drug, giving them a presence in Atlanta, north Georgia and western Alabama.  A few years later, Big B acquired 80 "Treasury Drug" stores from JCPenney's Thrift Drug division.  Big B was finally becoming a major drug retailer in the Atlanta area.
  
In 1996, Big B was acquired by Revco, and within a year Revco was acquired by CVS.  By the end of 1997, all Big B Drugs and Revco were operating as CVS/Pharmacy.

References
Bruno's Supermarkets annual reports 1971-1983
Big B, Inc.  Annual Reports 1982-1995
Imasco, Limited  Annual Report 1986-1989

Defunct pharmacies of the United States
Companies based in Birmingham, Alabama
Defunct companies based in Alabama
CVS Health
Retail companies established in 1968
Health care companies based in Alabama
Retail companies disestablished in 1996
1968 establishments in Alabama
1996 disestablishments in Alabama
American companies established in 1968
American companies disestablished in 1996